"You Raise Me Up" is a song originally composed by the Norwegian-Irish duo Secret Garden. The music was written by Secret Garden's Rolf Løvland, and the lyrics by Brendan Graham. After the song was performed early in 2002 by the Secret Garden and their invited lead singer, Brian Kennedy, the song only became a minor UK hit. The song has been recorded by more than a hundred other artists including American songwriter Josh Groban in 2003 and Irish boy band Westlife in 2005 whose versions were hits in their countries. Welsh singer Aled Jones and all-female Irish ensemble Celtic Woman have also recorded successful covers.

Background
Løvland composed an instrumental piece in 2002 and titled it "Silent Story". He later approached Irish novelist and songwriter Brendan Graham to write the lyrics to his melody, after reading Graham's novels. The song was performed for the very first time at the funeral of Løvland's mother. The original designated vocalist was Johnny Logan, who recorded a demo with an orchestra. However, the vocalist was changed due to a desire to distance the album from the Eurovision Song Contest, in which all three men were known for their success: Logan had won twice as a performer and twice as a composer; Løvland had won once as a performer and twice as a composer: and Graham had won twice as a composer.

In 2002, it was released on the Secret Garden album Once in a Red Moon, with the vocals sung by Irish singer Brian Kennedy, and sold well in both Ireland and Norway. Originally, Brian Kennedy was supposed to follow Secret Garden on their Asian tour in 2002, but Curb records couldn't come to an agreement with Universal to release Brian, and he reluctantly could not attend the tour. He was replaced by Norwegian singer Jan Werner Danielsen, who also later recorded the song together with Secret Garden. A demo version of this recording was released in 2010, on Danielsen's posthumous compilation album One More Time - The Very Best Of, which included several previously unpublished recordings.

"Söknuður" dispute
In April 2018 Icelandic composer Jóhann Helgason claimed the song infringed the copyright of his 1977 work "Söknuður," meaning "Into the light" sung by Vilhjálmur Vilhjálmsson, stating that Løvland would have
heard the song while living in Iceland. The Performing Rights Society of Iceland analyzed both songs and found a 97% similarity between them, stating that the songs are "musically identical" except for just two notes. It was disclosed at a press conference that Groban had "Söknuður" played for him in 2007, who reacted in an 'alarmed' fashion. He then admitted that the two songs were similar and he didn't know where the inspiration came from. Later, singer Edgar Smári performed "Söknuður" in English to outline the similarities.

In April 2019 the United States District Court of the Central District of California granted summary judgment in favor of Løvland and Graham, "finding that it is not substantially similar to Icelandic song Soknudur as a matter of law, and excluding plaintiff's expert musicologist's reports as unreliable, unhelpful, and inadmissible." The court acknowledged that the songs have similarities, but accepted the argument that those similar parts were not necessarily Helgason's own work in the first place; substantially the same material is in Danny Boy and other old public-domain songs.

Popularity
Although the original version did not chart internationally, the song has now been covered more than 125 times. Irish singer Daniel O'Donnell's version debuted at its peak position, number 22, in the UK Singles Chart on the week of 7–13 December 2003. It fell to number 35 the following week. It fell off the top 100 three weeks afterwards. Christian group Selah's version, included in their 2004 album Hiding Place, peaked number two on Billboards Hot Christian Songs and Christian Airplay on the week ending 25 June 2004. This recording was nominated for Song of the Year at the 2005 Dove Awards and appeared on WOW Hits 2005.

The Josh Groban peaked  73 in the Billboard Hot 100 and No. 1 on the US Adult Contemporary chart, Westlife No. 1 in the UK Singles Chart, and Dutch Popstars winner Wesley Klein No. 4 in the Netherlands. The song has also found success as part of a three-song EP entitled "George Best - A Tribute" by Peter Corry and the song's original vocalist Brian Kennedy, which reached No. 4 in the UK.

In 2004, the song was played more than 500,000 times on American radio. In late 2005, there were over 80 versions available in US alone, and it has been nominated for Gospel Music Awards four times, including "Song of the Year."

On 21 September 2006, "You Raise Me Up" became the first song to have sold over 76,000 copies of the score on the popular sheet music website musicnotes.com.

Josh Groban version

In 2003, David Foster decided to produce the song after being introduced to it by Frank Petrone of peermusic, the song's publisher. He chose the up-and-coming Josh Groban to record the song, which was accompanied by the tenor Craig Von Vennik of the Establishment. Groban's version made it to No. 1 on the Billboard adult contemporary chart in early 2004 and remained there for six weeks. This version also peaked at No. 73 on the Billboard Hot 100, his first single to do so, and was nominated for a 2005 Grammy Award for Best Male Pop Vocal Performance.

Performances
Groban performed the song at Super Bowl XXXVIII, in a special NASA commemoration for the crew of the Space Shuttle Columbia disaster. A special surprise performance by Groban, for Oprah Winfrey's 50th birthday, also gave "You Raise Me Up" international prominence. On 25 April 2007, Groban also performed it at the first Idol Gives Back Concert, along with the African Children's Choir. This version was released as a single and peaked at No. 76 on the Billboard Hot 100. He performed this version with the African Children's Choir again on The Ellen DeGeneres Show on 10 August 2007.

On 26 May 2007, Josh Groban appeared on BBC's talent show Any Dream Will Do to select one of the remaining contestants (or "Josephs") to perform the song with him. He chose show favourite and eventual winner Lee Mead, whilst the other four contestants (Lewis Bradley, Craig Chalmers, Ben Ellis, and Keith Jack) performed as backing singers. Following this, the solo version of "You Raise Me Up" charted in the UK at No. 74, making it his first chart entry there.

Charts

Weekly charts

Year-end charts

Westlife version

"You Raise Me Up" was released as the lead single from Westlife's sixth studio album Face to Face. This version is one of the most successful covers of the song, peaking at No. 1 on the UK Singles Chart, the only version to do so. This was the band's 13th number-one single as well as the first single to be released following  Brian McFadden's departure from the group. It debuted with 97,288 combined physical and download sales in the UK alone. The single has sold 600,000 copies in the UK so far. In South Korea, it entered the Official South Korean Year-end Downloads Singles Chart in 2010 with 130,759 sales. Later, it stayed in the top 75 of the Official International Karaoke Charts since the inception of the charts in December 2010 up to its recent chart released.

Westlife performed this song with Secret Garden at the 2005 Nobel Peace Prize concert. On 11 December 2009, they performed it again at the 2009 Nobel Peace Prize concert celebrating US President Barack Obama. The backing track is re-used in the Spanish version of this song, "Por Ti Sere", performed by Il Divo in their Siempre album. When Louis Walsh suggested the band to record it, Filan, Egan, Byrne, and Feehily were against it saying it was a church song, and would not be a success. They also said they did not want to record it. However, they have since claimed in 2011, six years after the single's release, that the song changed their careers and were glad they recorded it. It was composed in the traditional verse–chorus form in E♭ major, with Filan and Feehily's vocal ranging from the chords of B♭2 to B♭4.

Westlife's official music video for "You Raise Me Up" was directed by Alex Hemming. It is currently the most-played version on YouTube with over 100 million views as of July 2021. The 4K version of the music video has been released on Westlife' official YouTube channel. It is also their most-streamed single of all time with 19.7 million listens in the United Kingdom as of January 2019. It is the band's third best selling single of all-time on both paid-for and combined sales categories. While it is their eighth most streamed song of all time from their home country, the Republic of Ireland, as of 2 April 2019. It is the second best-selling single of 2005 in Ireland.

The song was reinstated in the live bonus disc album of the band's Greatest Hits in 2011. 
After the band broke up in 2012, the single was performed solo in many live instances by three of band members Shane Filan, Kian Egan and Mark Feehily. In 2018, the single was re-recorded by its member Shane Filan for his solo album Love Always - Deluxe Version. On 12 May 2018, the song was performed on South Korean music programme Immortal Songs 2 by Sohyang. Filan was the featured 'Legend' and judged the participants.

Track listingsUK CD1 and European CD single "You Raise Me Up" – 4:00
 "World of Our Own" (acoustic version) – 3:30UK CD2 "You Raise Me Up" – 4:00
 "Flying Without Wings" (acoustic) – 3:30
 "My Love" (acoustic) – 3:48Australian CD single "You Raise Me Up" – 4:00
 "You Raise Me Up" (Chameleon Remix) – 3:17
 "You Raise Me Up" (Reactor Remix) – 3:29
 "Flying Without Wings" (acoustic) – 3:30
 "My Love" (acoustic) – 3:48

Charts

Monthly charts

Year-end charts

Certifications

Wesley version

On the second season of Popstars in the Netherlands, "You Raise Me Up" was recorded by each of the four finalists - Kim Stolker, Kristel Roulaux, Joshua Newton and Wesley Klein. When Klein won, his version was released as a single in the Netherlands under the mononym Wesley, peaking at No. 4 on the Dutch Top 40 and staying in the charts for eleven weeks, making it the first version of the song to reach the top 10 in the Netherlands. The song was subsequently released as the final track on his debut album Vandaag en morgen (meaning Today and Tomorrow in Dutch).

Weekly charts

Year-end charts

See also
List of Billboard Adult Contemporary number ones of 2004

ReferencesNotes'

External links
Thornes Music

2000s ballads
2001 songs
2003 singles
2005 singles
2006 singles
2010 debut singles
Josh Groban songs
Secret Garden (duo) songs
Westlife songs
Number-one singles in Scotland
UK Singles Chart number-one singles
Irish Singles Chart number-one singles
Songs about loneliness
Gospel songs
Irish folk songs
Songs written by Rolf Løvland
Songs written by Brendan Graham
Song recordings produced by David Foster
Song recordings produced by Steve Mac
Sanna Nielsen songs
143 Records singles
Reprise Records singles
Sony BMG singles
Warner Records singles
Pop ballads
Pop-folk songs
RCA Records singles
Songs involved in plagiarism controversies
Syco Music singles